The men's triple jump at the 1974 European Athletics Championships was held in Rome, Italy, at Stadio Olimpico on 8 September 1974.

Medalists

Results

Final
8 September

Participation
According to an unofficial count, 15 athletes from 10 countries participated in the event.

 (1)
 (2)
 (1)
 (1)
 (1)
 (1)
 (1)
 (3)
 (1)
 (3)

References

Triple jump
Triple jump at the European Athletics Championships